Don Bosco School Manila (full school name: Don Bosco School (Salesian Sisters), Inc. - Manila, also known as DBS), is an educational institution owned and operated by the Daughters of Mary Help of Christians (FMA). DBS has its own informational handbook which comprises the guidelines and all other information about the school.

History
Founded in 1989, the Salesian educational institution started its humble operations. Don Bosco Technical College (DBTC) in Mandaluyong is a pioneer of Salesian Schools in Metro Manila. It belongs to the priests or Salesians of Don Bosco (SDB). DBTC gradually phased out their pre-school and primary levels. DBTC also temporarily transferred some of their primary level faculty to Don Bosco School Manila. The administration and policies applied to this agreement followed the DBTC Manual for students, faculty and staff. The Salesian Sisters Administration of DBS Manila and the Salesian Fathers Administration of DBTC Mandaluyong worked in close supervision and collaboration until April 1993 when the last group of transferees had finished their Grade 4 and enrolled back at DBTC to finish their Intermediate and High school. Faculty members who were temporarily transferred to DBS Manila were offered a choice as to their preferred employer.

However, this agreement did not hinder the administration of DBS to start its own co-educational pre-school and grade school levels and to employ directly its new faculty and staff in 1989. In April 1993, DBS Manila and DBTC Mandaluyong finally ended its temporary phase in and phase out agreement.

In 1994, the first class of Grade 5 students (all females) started the intermediate level. In 1996, the school held its first Commencement Exercises of its 59 graduates in the Elementary Course. In 2000, the program for the Secondary Education was completed.

The school started to accept boys in the Grade 5 level during the school year 2004–2005. These male students were accepted into the secondary level (S.Y. 2006–2007) after a consultation made by the Educating Community Core Group. The results of the consultation showed that majority of  prefer to send their in DBS until they finish their secondary school.

External links
Don Bosco School official website
DBS past pupils' nook
DBS at DepEd.gov.ph

Catholic elementary schools in Manila
Catholic secondary schools in Manila
Manila
Education in Santa Mesa